The 1982–83 Israel State Cup (Gvia HaMedina) was the 44th season of Israel's nationwide football cup competition and the 29th after the Israeli Declaration of Independence.

The competition was won by Hapoel Tel Aviv who have beaten Maccabi Tel Aviv 3–2 in the final, the deciding goal being scored by Gili Landau, who used his hand to score the goal.

Results

Fifth Round

Sixth Round

Seventh Round

Round of 16

Quarter-finals

Semi-finals

Final

References
100 Years of Football 1906-2006, Elisha Shohat (Israel), 2006, p. 259
Cup (Page 7) Hadshot HaSport, 12.12.1982, archive.football.co.il 
Cup (Pages 2-4) Hadshot HaSport, 23.1.1983, archive.football.co.il 
Cup (Page 4) Hadshot HaSport, 27.1.1983, archive.football.co.il 
Cup (Pages 2-7) Hadshot HaSport, 6.2.1983, archive.football.co.il 
0-0 with 23 goals! (Page 4) Hadshot HaSport, 9.2.1983, archive.football.co.il 

Israel State Cup
State Cup
Israel State Cup seasons